Antonín Bečvář (10 June 1901 – 10 January 1965) was a Czech astronomer who was active in Slovakia. He was born (and died) in Stará Boleslav. Among his chief achievements is the foundation of the Skalnaté Pleso Observatory and the discovery of the comet C/1947 F2 (Bečvář) (also known by the designations 1947 III and 1947c).  His lifelong illness led him to the High Tatras where he founded the observatory.

Bečvář is particularly important for his star charts: he led the compilation of the Atlas Coeli Skalnate Pleso (1951), published by Sky Publishing Corporation as the Skalnate Pleso Atlas of the Heavens, which was the state-of-the-art atlas of its kind until Wil Tirion's "Sky Atlas 2000.0" in 1981. A dozen star names in the atlas are of unknown origin, no connection to any language or previous source has been discovered despite an extensive search.

He also compiled Atlas eclipticalis, 1950.0 (1958), Atlas borealis 1950.0 (1962), and Atlas australis 1950.0 (1964).

The asteroid 4567 Bečvář and the crater Bečvář on the Moon were named in his honour. American Avant-garde composer John Cage used Bečvář's star charts as the basis of several works: Atlas Eclipticalis (1961–62), Etudes Australes (1974–75), Etudes Boreales (1978) and Freeman Etudes (1977–80, 1989–90).

References

External links
 Becvar's sky atlases
 Star Map in Galactic Perspective Uses imagery from Becvar's Atlas of the Heavens.

1901 births
1965 deaths
People from Brandýs nad Labem-Stará Boleslav
Czech astronomers
Slovak astronomers
20th-century astronomers
Czechoslovak astronomers
Austro-Hungarian astronomers